FAM71E2, also known as Family With Sequence Similarity 71 Member E2, is a protein that, in humans, is encoded by the FAM71E2 gene. Aliases include C19orf16, Protein FAM71E2, Chromosome 19 open reading frame 16, and Putative Protein FAM71E2. The gene is primarily conserved in mammals, but it is also conserved in two reptile species.

Gene

Location
FAM71E2 is located on the minus strand at 9q13.42 and extends from 55,354,908 bp to 55,363,252 bp. The gene is 8,353 bp long, and has 11 exons.

Gene Neighborhood 
These genes are closest to FAM71E2 on the human genome

 TMEM190: protein with unknown function.
 COX6B2: protein that connects the two COX monomers into the physiological dimeric form.
 KMT5B: protein with unknown function.
 IL11: cytokine with multiple functions.

Transcript

mRNA variants
Two alternatively spliced mRNA variants are produced during transcription: aAUG10 and bAUG10. They are both validated alternative polyadenylation sites. However, there are no isoforms of FAM71E2.

Stem loops 

Conserved stem loop regions were found on both the 5' and 3' UTR in closely related orthologs. There were no conserved stem loops for distantly related orthologs.

Protein

Properties

FAM71E2 is 922 amino acids long and has a molecular weight of 10/100,000 pI/Mw. The protein has four different domains: DUF3699, PRK14951, PHA03247, and BASP1. The structure consists of 8 alpha helixes and 1 beta sheet.

Localization
This protein is localized in the nucleus.  Localization in the nucleus is conserved in all orthologs.

Gene regulation

Promoter
The promoter of FAM71E2 is located between 55363152 and 55364260 on the minus strand and is 1,109 bp long. This promoter was selected based on its main expression in the testes and high CAGE values.

Transcription factor binding sites 
Multiple transcription factor binding sites were found for FAM71E2. They were selected based on relatedness to potential gene function such as SOX11 and estrogen response elements.

Expression 
FAM71E2 is primarily expressed in male tissues, particularly the testis. There is also lower expression in the brain, mammary gland, prostate, and thymus. FAM71E2 has also been expressed in breast (mammary gland) tumor and normal tissues.

Metaphase II stage oocytes matured in vivo 

The graph on the right is from a study analyzing the Metaphase II stage oocytes matured in vivo. The goal of this study was to identify genes and deduced pathways from human oocyte that can help us understand oogenesis, folliculogenesis, fertilization, and embryonic development. The control consisted of RNA from 10 different normal human tissues: skeletal muscle, kidney, lung, colon, liver, spleen, breast, brain, heart, and stomach. The results from this study indicate that expression of FAM71E2 in oocytes is very low compared to that of normal adult tissue from various parts of the body. Human protein atlas supports these observations since there was no expression during the earliest phase of development (embryoid body). However, Human protein atlas also showed there was very minimal expression in the fetus.

Estrogen receptor alpha-silenced MCF7 breast cancer cells 

This study indicates that there is a very slight decrease in FAM71E2 expression in estrogen receptor knockdown samples. This study may also support the Human protein atlas information stating FAM71E2 has slight expression in Breast (mammary glad) tumors.

Neural transcription factor SOX11 depletion effect on mantle cell lymphoma cell line 
This study was conducted by looking at mantle cell lymphoma cells depleted for the transcription factor SOX11. What is interesting is that FAM71E2 is expressed higher in the SOX11 depleted cells than the control, even though there are SOX11 transcription factors in FAM71E2. It may be possible that these transcription factors exist but are simply not transcribed. Further research on this topic should be conducted.

Homology 
Paralogs

FAM71 has many paralogs, especially from FAM71. The paralogs are sorted by similarity. The paralogs in the table were selected based on their e-value and relevance to the FAM71 family. E-value range: 0 to 3e^-11. Similarity range: 100% to 51%. 

Orthologs

Interacting proteins 
There are several interacting proteins with FAM71E2. One protein interaction program predicted NOTCH2NL, P60369, ALB, and MTUS2 interact with FAM71E2.  NOTCH2NL might have a role in the Notch signaling pathway as well as regulating neutrophil differentiation. P60369 is a hair keratin-associated protein. ALB functions as a regulator of colloidal osmotic pressure of blood, as well as a major zinc transporter. MTUS2 main function is to bind microtubules.

Another protein interaction program predicted BOD1L2, FAM200A, CCT8L2, OR9G1, and AMPD3 interact with FAM71E2. BOD1L2 may have a role in biorientation via mitotic spindles. CCT8L2 assists folding proteins after ATP hydrolysis. OR9G1 functions as an odorant receptor. AMPD3 functions in energy metabolism. FAM200A has no known function.

Future research 
Based on expression data, there are several topics that can be explored to learn more about the exact function of FAM71E2.

 Further studies should look at expression analysis during developmental stages. There was minimal expression in fetus on Human protein atlas. Another study should be conducted to determine if this expression is true or if the results are from an error. The information gathered from the expression analysis for oocyte indicate that FAM71E2 is expressed far lower during embryotic development than in adult humans. This cannot be equated with expression in fetuses, but additional studies should be conducted to determine if, how much, and what stage of development expression exists.
 Additional research should indicate if FAM71E2 is expressed more, less or equally in breast tissue and breast tumors.
 Further research on SOX11 transcription factor expression.

References 

Proteins
Human genes